Chahar Melan (also Romanized as Chahār Melān) is a village in Satar Rural District, Kolyai District, Sonqor County, Kermanshah Province, Iran. At the 2006 census, its population was 102, in 23 families.

References 

Populated places in Sonqor County